Dion De Neve (born 12 June 2001) is a Belgian footballer who plays for Kortrijk.

Club career
He made his Belgian First Division A debut for Zulte Waregem on 24 July 2021 in a game against OH Leuven.

On 4 April 2022, De Neve signed a three-year contract with Kortrijk, effective from the 2022–23 season.

References

External links
 

2001 births
Sportspeople from Aalst, Belgium
Footballers from East Flanders
Living people
Belgian footballers
Belgium youth international footballers
Association football defenders
S.V. Zulte Waregem players
K.V. Kortrijk players
Belgian Pro League players